Cashel, Ontario is a small hamlet situated in Unionville, Ontario located at the intersection of Elgin Mills Road and York Regional Road 67. Originally it was called Crosby Corners after John Crosby (born 1797), the village's first store owner, who came originally from New York State. The name was changed to Cashel in 1851 with the opening of its first post office (located at southwest corner of Major Mackenzie and McCowan Road - now farmland).  It was likely named after Cashel in Ireland. In 1851 the community had a sawmill, cobbler shop, blacksmith shop, wagon shop, inn and tavern, Masonic Lodge, and Presbyterian church. In 1890 Peaches United Church was built on land from farmer Thomas Peach at 10762 McCowan Road. The church is a historic site and not operating since the 1960s to 1970s, but cemetery remains in active use. The east west sideroad along the church was locally called Peaches (Peach's) Sideroad or otherwise known as Elgin Mills Road. 

There are few dwellings located at the site, most of them near York Regional Road 3, the western boundary of this community. Other parts of the community is mainly farmlands. Cashel's northern boundary is the town of Whitchurch–Stouffville. The community is home to the Markham Fairgrounds.

Nearby communities
Stouffville, north
Quartztown, south
Historical Village of Markham, south-east
Angus Glen, south-west
Victoria Square, west
Uxbridge, east

References

Neighbourhoods in Markham, Ontario